Barbara Jane Bain (born 1941) is an Australian haematologist and oncologist. She is a professor at the Imperial College Faculty of Medicine and a consultant at St Mary's Hospital, London. She is known as the author of reference textbooks in the field of haematology that form the core curriculum for laboratory morphology and pathology.

Early life and education 
Bain grew up in Australia and was educated in Maryborough, Queensland. She completed her undergraduate  studies at the University of Queensland, where she was awarded the University Gold Medal. Bain was a registrar at the Princess Alexandra Hospital. She traveled to England in late 1971, supported by a scholarship from the Royal Australasian College of Physicians. Her career choice was influenced by mentors John Dacie, David Galton and Daniel Catovsky. She said that she wanted to work in haematology due to a combination of laboratory and clinical work.

Research and career 
In 1972, Bain joined St Mary's Hospital as a lecturer, where she was made a reader in 2000 and professor in 2004. She is an expert in haematology and the translation of laboratory breakthroughs to clinical science. For example, she investigated myelodysplastic syndrome, which can evolve into acute myeloid leukaemia and dysplastic haemopoiesis without proper diagnosis and treatment. 

At St Mary's, Bain developed a training program on haematology, covering topics such as the analysis of blood and bone marrow samples and genetic disorders that affect haemoglobin. She helped to develop bloodmed.com, an online educational course that is taken by almost all UK trainees. The course was incorporated to the British Society for Haematology website. She was part of the International Working Group on Morphology of MDS and also in the group which devised the 2008 WHO classification of tumours of the lymphoid haematopoietic systems. She has translated two editions of an Italian work on the morphology of the blood. In 2019, the Queensland University of Technology announced the Barbara Bain prize for Haematology.

Awards and honours 
 2017 Maryborough Walk of Achievers
 2017 British Society for Haematology Lifetime Achievement Award
 2018 European Hematology Association Mentoring and Teaching Award
 2020 Queen's Birthday Honours

Selected publications

Articles

Books

References

External links 
 Website jointly compiled by Bain and her husband

Australian women medical doctors
Australian medical doctors
Australian haematologists
Living people
Year of birth missing (living people)
Australian expatriates in the United Kingdom
Place of birth missing (living people)
Academics of Imperial College London
Physicians of St Mary's Hospital, London
Women medical writers
Australian medical writers
University of Queensland alumni